Leandro Prates de Oliveira (2 February 1982 – 6 July 2021) was a Brazilian track and field athlete who specialised in the 1500 metres. He won gold medals in the event at the 2011 South American Championships in Athletics and the 2011 Pan American Games.

Oliveira was born in Vitória da Conquista, Bahia. He started competing at national level in 2006 and that year he came third over 1500 m at the Brazilian championships and set a personal best of 3:42.62 minutes. The following year he won his first international medal at the 2007 South American Championships in Athletics, where he was the 1500 m silver medallist behind Byron Piedra. He ran in both the 800 metres and 1500 m events at the 2007 Summer Universiade, but did not progress beyond the preliminary races. He did not compete internationally in 2008 and 2009, but improved his 1500 m best to 3:40.07 minutes in this period.

At the 2010 Ibero-American Championships he won the 1500 m bronze medal before taking the 3000 metres title. He represented Brazil at the 2011 IAAF World Cross Country Championships and placed 73rd in the longer 12 km race. He established himself as one of South America's best middle-distance runners on the track later that year. First he won the South American Road Championship over the mile and then he beat his compatriot Hudson de Souza to the 1500 m title at the 2011 South American Championships in Athletics. After winning the Brazilian title in the event, he was selected for the 2011 Pan American Games. In a highly tactical final, he edged Ecuador's Byron Piedra at the line to claim the gold medal.

Personal bests

Competition record

References

External links

1982 births
2021 deaths
Sportspeople from Bahia
Brazilian male middle-distance runners
Brazilian male steeplechase runners
Pan American Games athletes for Brazil
Pan American Games gold medalists for Brazil
Pan American Games medalists in athletics (track and field)
Athletes (track and field) at the 2011 Pan American Games
Medalists at the 2011 Pan American Games
21st-century Brazilian people
20th-century Brazilian people